The 1991 ITU Triathlon World Cup was a series of triathlon races organised by the International Triathlon Union (ITU) for elite-level triathletes. There were eleven races held in eight countries, most of them held over a distance of 1500 m swim, 40 km cycle, 10 km run (an Olympic-distance triathlon).

Results

Saint Croix, U.S. Virgin Islands 
 1991-05-05 (2 km swim, 50 km bike, 12 km run; US$60,000)

San Andrés, Colombia 
 1991-05-19 (1.5 km swim, 40 km bike, 10 km run; US$20,000)

Portaferry, Ireland 
 1991-07-13 (1.1 km swim, 43 km bike, 10 km run; US$20,000)

Vancouver, British Columbia 
 1991-07-27 (1.5 km swim, 40 km bike, 10 km run; US$20,000)

Toronto, Ontario 
 1991-08-04 (1.5 km swim, 40 km bike, 10 km run; US$20,000)

Embrun, France 
 1991-08-15 (1.5 km swim, 40 km bike, 10 km run; US$30,000)

Beijing, PR China 
 1991-09-01 (1.5 km swim, 40 km bike, 10 km run; US$20,000)

Texas Hill, United States 
 1991-09-07 (2.7 km swim, 88 km bike, 18 km run; US$20,000)

Paris, France 
 1991-09-15 (1.5 km swim, 40 km bike, 10 km run; US$20,000)

Las Vegas, United States 
 1991-09-21 (1.5 km swim, 40 km bike, 10 km run; US$30,000)

Ixtapa, Mexico 
 1991-11-16 (1.5 km swim, 40 km bike, 10 km run; US$20,000)

Final ranking

See also 
 1991 ITU Triathlon World Championships

References 
 Results

ITU Triathlon World Cup
World Cup